Johnny Bulunbulun (1946-2010) was a Ganalbingu Aboriginal artist.

He had a posthumous joint exhibition with Zhou Xiaoping in Beijing  and Melbourne, called "Trepang: China & the Story of Macassan - Aboriginal Trade".

Awards
Since 1993, the Australia Council for the Arts, the arts funding and advisory body for the Government of Australia, has awarded a Red Ochre Award to an outstanding Indigenous Australian (Aboriginal Australian or Torres Strait Islander) artist for lifetime achievement. In 2004, it was awarded to Bulunbulun.

Exhibitions 
Trepang: China & the story of Macassan – Aboriginal Trade, Capital Museum, Beijing.
Trepang: China & the story of Macassan – Aboriginal Trade, Melbourne Museum.

Collections 
Artbank, Sydney.
Art Gallery of New South Wales, Sydney
Art Gallery of Western Australia, Perth
Central Collection, Australian National University, Canberra
Djomi Museum, Maningrida
Edith Cowan University Collection Perth Western Australia
Flinders University Art Museum, Adelaide
Holmes à Court Collection, Perth
Kluge Foundation, Morven Estate, Charlottesville, Virginia, USA
Milingimbi Collection, MECA, Milingimbi Educational and Cultural Association
Museum and Art Gallery of the Northern Territory, Darwin
Museum of Contemporary Art, Maningrida Collection, Sydney
National Gallery of Australia, Canberra.
National Gallery of Victoria, Melbourne. 
National Maritime Museum, Darling Harbour, Sydney
Parliament House Art Collection, Canberra
The Kelton Foundation, Santa Monica, USA

References

External links 
Parliament House Art Collection
John Bulunbulun at the Art Gallery of New South Wales
Red Ochre Award, Australia Council for the Arts
WorldCat

1946 births
2010 deaths
Australian Aboriginal artists
Australian painters
Artists from the Northern Territory